The Lloyd Hall (German:Lloydhalle) was a passenger terminal in Bremerhaven, at the "Kaiserhafen I" dock, was built in 1870, rebuilt in 1897, and destroyed in 1944 during World War II.

Background 

After 1890, large passenger ships could no longer be accommodated in Bremerhaven, but instead were sent  to Nordenham on the opposite side of the Weser river.

At the same time, the Lloyd Hall was completed at the base of the wharf on the western quay of the Kaiser lock in order to accommodate the increased passenger load.

The second Lloyd Hall was designed and built by the contractor and architect . It had several waiting rooms, a customs and baggage hall and the telegraph station. From the covered platform, the upper cabin classes by boat at the boat, which was anchored in the and ready to depart. Most of the emigrants on the "between deck" and had already boarded at Kaiserhafen III.

On July 27, 1900, Kaiser Wilhelm II gave his well-known "Hun Speech" in front of the Lloyd Hall at of the farewell of the German East Asian Expeditionary Force to suppress the Boxer Rebellion in Imperial China. The speech was seen by many as a failure.

The  and the Columbusbahnhof  were completed in 1927 in order to be able to handle the large express steamers of the NDL, such as the Columbus, Bremen or Europa, more quickly at the conveniently located Stromkaje. After the facilities were commissioned, the Lloyd Hall was only used for passenger handling on small emigrant ships. In 1944 it was destroyed by bombs.

The third Lloyd Hall was built in 1927 during the construction of Columbuskaje and the Columbusbahnhof.

The Lloyd Hall was named after the shipping company Norddeutscher Lloyd. The Lloyd part of the name comes from Edward Lloyd, who opened Lloyd's Coffee House in London in 1688 and which is believed to be the founding place of Lloyd's of London, then a thriving marine insurer and now an insurance exchange. The term Lloyd stood for seriousness worldwide.

References 

Buildings and structures demolished in the 1940s
Norddeutscher Lloyd
Buildings and structures completed in the 1890s